Alis District is one of thirty-three districts of the province Yauyos in Peru.

See also 
 Muchka
 Puka Puka
 Sapallan Warmi
 Wachwa Runtuna

References